The Llanfallteg Formation is a geologic formation in Wales. It preserves fossils dating back to the Ordovician period. It predominantly consists of ash containing siltstones, as wells as ash fall deposits and tuffs. It likely dates to the Darriwilian based on graptolites. The local graptolite fauna includes Didymograptus artus and Glossograptus armatus. The local trilobite fauna includes agnostids, phacopids and asaphids.

See also

 List of fossiliferous stratigraphic units in England

References

 

Geologic formations of England
Ordovician System of Europe
Ordovician Wales
Ordovician southern paleotemperate deposits